Esra Özkan (born September 8, 1996) is a Turkish women's football forward last played in the Turkish Women's Third Football League for Çerkezköy 1923 Gençlik Spor in Çerkezköy, Tekirdağ with jersey number 6.

Career

Club

Esra Özkan obtained her license on November 15, 2007. She entered Marmara Üniversitesispor in the 2008–09 season. She played five full seasons, of which two were in the Turkish Women's First season. In the mid of the 2013–14 First League season, she transferred to Ataşehir Belediyespor. She was capped 77 times and scored 27 goals with Marmara Üniversitesispor.

Özkan serves as the captain of the girls' football team at her high school, which is a top-ranking team of the Turkish High School Girls' Football Championship. She plays also futsal in her school team. She was part of the team representing Turkey at the 2014 ISF World Schools Futsal Championship held in Italy that became champion in the girls' category.

In the second half of the 2014–15 season, she transferred to Istanbul-based Second League team Kireçburnu Spor. At the end of the season, her team enjoyed promotion to the Women's First League.

Özkan stayed the following two seasons away from the football pitch. In December 2017, in the mid of the 2017–18 season, she transferred to the Women's Third League club Çerkezköy 1923 Gençlik Spor. After scoring two goals in nine matches, she retred.

International
She was called up to the Turkey women's U-17 team debuting in the 2012 UEFA Women's Under-17 Championship qualification match against the Serbian girls on September 29, 2011.

Özkan was admitted to the Turkey women's U-19 team playing her first game in a friendly match against junior women from Bosnia and Herzegovina on April 3, 2013.

Career statistics

Honours
 Turkey Women's First League
 Ataşehir Belediyespor
 Runners-up (1): 2013–14

 ISF World Schools Futsal Championship
 Mevlana Vocational High School
 Winners (1): 2014

References

External links

 

Living people
1996 births
People from Üsküdar
Footballers from Istanbul
Turkish women's footballers
Women's association football midfielders
Women's association football forwards
Turkish women's futsal players
Marmara Üniversitesi Spor players
Ataşehir Belediyespor players
Kireçburnu Spor players
21st-century Turkish sportswomen